The 2015-16 Czech 1. liga season was the 22nd season of the Czech 1. liga, the second level of ice hockey in the Czech Republic. 14 teams participated in the league.

HC Slavia Praha and HC Dukla Jihlava have won this season of the league, neither succeeded in the Extraliga qualification.

HC Sumperk was relegated to the Czech 2. liga after 5 years in the Czech 1. Liga. They have been replaced by HC Frýdek-Místek, who have been promoted from the 2. Liga.

Format 
14 teams compete in the league, with the top 6 teams at the end of the regular season play qualifying for the playoffs. The teams that finish 7th through 10th play a play-in series (best-of-five) to determine who will join the top six into the playoff quarter-finals (best-of-seven). No final is played. Instead, two teams which win the semifinals are declared co-champions and both advance to the qualifying group against two worst placed teams at the end of the Extraliga regular season.

The four lowest ranked teams (11–14) after the regular season play in a play-out group (12 games, all regular-season matches are counted into the ranking). The worst team after 12 rounds is relegated to the Czech 2. Liga.

Regular season

Playoffs

2016-17 Extraliga qualification 

HC Litvinov have qualified to the Extraliga for the 2016-17 season.

HC Karlovy Vary have qualified to the Extraliga for the 2016-17 season.

HC Slavia Praha failed to qualify for the 2016-17 Czech Extraliga season. They will resume playing in the Czech 1. Liga.

HC Dukla Jihlava failed to qualify for the 2016-17 Czech Extraliga season. They will resume playing in the Czech 1. Liga.

Play-out 

Salith Šumperk was relegated.

2015–16 in Czech ice hockey leagues
Czech 1. Liga seasons
2015–16 in European second tier ice hockey leagues